Japan competed at the 1994 Winter Olympics in Lillehammer, Norway, from February 12 to February 27, 1994. A total of 65 athletes competed with 45 officers. The flag bearer is Nordic combined skier Reiichi Mikata, while the captain of the delegation is speed skater Seiko Hashimoto.

The Nordic combined team was able to retain the gold medal from the same previous achievement in Albertville 1992. Overall the Japanese team won 1 gold, 2 silver and 2 bronze, and managed to finish in eleventh place on the medal table.

As Nagano would be the host city for the following Winter Olympics, a traditional Japanese segment was performed at the end of the closing ceremony.

Medalists

Competitors
The following is the list of number of competitors in the Games.

Alpine skiing

Men

Men's combined

Women

Women's combined

Biathlon

Men

Women

 1 A penalty loop of 150 metres had to be skied per missed target.
 2 One minute added per missed target.

Bobsleigh

Cross-country skiing

Men

 1 Starting delay based on 10 km results. 
 C = Classical style, F = Freestyle

Men's 4 × 10 km relay

Women

 2 Starting delay based on 5 km results. 
 C = Classical style, F = Freestyle

Figure skating

Men

Women

Freestyle skiing

Men

Women

Luge

Men

(Men's) Doubles

Nordic combined 

Men's individual

Events:
 normal hill ski jumping
 15 km cross-country skiing 

Men's Team

Three participants per team.

Events:
 normal hill ski jumping
 10 km cross-country skiing

Short track speed skating

Men

Women

Ski jumping 

Men's team large hill

 1 Four teams members performed two jumps each.

Speed skating

Men

Women

References

Official Olympic Reports
International Olympic Committee results database
Japan Olympic Committee database
 Olympic Winter Games 1994, full results by sports-reference.com

Nations at the 1994 Winter Olympics
1994
Winter Olympics